{{DISPLAYTITLE:C10H12FNO}}
The molecular formula for C10H12FNO (molar mass: 181.21 g/mol, exact mass: 181.0903 u) may refer to:

 Flephedrone, also known as 4-fluoromethcathinone (4-FMC)
 3-Fluoromethcathinone